Odd Christian Eiking (born 28 December 1994) is a Norwegian cyclist, who rides for UCI WorldTeam .

Career
Born in Stord, Eiking was named in the startlist for the 2016 Vuelta a España.

In July 2019, he was named in the startlist for the Tour de France.

At the 2021 Vuelta a España, Eiking was part of a 31-rider breakaway group on the tenth stage, from which he was the highest-placed rider in the general classification, trailing race leader Primož Roglič by just over nine minutes overnight. The group's advantage over the peloton reached over thirteen minutes at its maximum, with Eiking ultimately finishing almost eleven-and-a-half minutes clear of Roglič, to take the race leader's red jersey. He held the race lead until the final week, ceding the jersey on stage 17, when he was dropped on the second of four categorised climbs to be ascented during the stage. He lost 9' 23" by the end of the stage, dropping to eleventh overall, where he would ultimately finish in the general classification. A few days after the race, Eiking signed a contract with the  team for the 2022 season.

Major results
Source: 

2013
 10th Overall Tour de Berlin
2014
 2nd Overall Giro della Valle d'Aosta
 3rd Road race, National Road Championships
 4th Road race, National Under-23 Road Championships
 4th Hadeland GP
 5th Ringerike GP
2015
 1st  Road race, National Under-23 Road Championships
 1st  Young rider classification, Tour of Norway
 1st Stage 2 Giro della Valle d'Aosta
 2nd Road race, National Road Championships
 3rd Overall Peace Race U23
 3rd Ringerike GP
 5th Hadeland GP
 6th Overall Arctic Race of Norway
2016
 1st Stage 1 (TTT) La Méditerranéenne
 4th Overall Tour of Norway
1st  Young rider classification
 5th Overall Arctic Race of Norway
2017
 1st Boucles de l'Aulne
 10th Classic Loire-Atlantique
2018
 1st Stage 3 Tour de Wallonie
 2nd Grand Prix La Marseillaise
 8th Overall Tour of Oman
 8th Paris–Chauny
2019
 Arctic Race of Norway
1st  Mountains classification
1st Stage 3
 3rd Ardèche Classic
 3rd Grand Prix de Plumelec-Morbihan
 6th Overall Tour of Guangxi
 8th Grand Prix de Wallonie
2021
 2nd Overall Arctic Race of Norway
 7th Clásica de San Sebastián
 10th Overall Étoile de Bessèges
 10th Grand Prix La Marseillaise
 Vuelta a España
Held  after Stages 10–16
2022
 2nd Coppa Sabatini

Grand Tour general classification results timeline

References

External links

 Odd Christian Eiking at 
 
 
 
 
 

1994 births
Living people
Norwegian male cyclists
People from Stord
Sportspeople from Vestland